Radical Abolitionism: Anarchy and the Government of God in Antislavery Thought is a 1973 book by Lewis Perry on radicals in the abolition movement.

Bibliography

External links 

 Full text from the Internet Archive

1973 non-fiction books
Books about anarchism
English-language books
Abolitionism in the United States
Cornell University Press books